Señorita Colombia 2019 was the 67th edition of the Miss Colombia pageant. It was held at the Cartagena de Indias Convention Center in Cartagena de Indias, Colombia on November 11, 2019.

At the end of the event, Gabriela Tafur of Valle del Cauca crowned María Fernanda Aristizábal of Quindío as Señorita Colombia 2019-2020. Aristizábal was set to compete at Miss Universe 2020, but since June 2020, Natalie Ackermann gained ownership of the Miss Universe franchise of Colombia, where a new pageant would select the representative of Colombia to the Miss Universe pageant. The new organization did not allow Aristizábal to compete in Miss Universe 2020, thus barring Aristizábal to compete in the said pageant. On April 6, 2022, Aristizábal was appointed as Miss Universe Colombia 2022 by the Miss Universe Colombia Organization and represented Colombia at Miss Universe 2022, and concluded as a Top 16 semi-finalist.

Results

Final results 
  The contestant was a Semi-Finalist in an International pageant.
  The contestant did not place.

Special awards

Pageant

Format
The results of the preliminary competition, which consisted of the swimsuit competition, the evening gown competition, and the closed-door interview, will determine the 10 semi-finalists who will advance to the first cut. The top 10 finalists compete in swimsuit and evening gown, while the top 5 are in a qualifying question, and then undergo the final round of questions and a final catwalk, the winner being decided by a panel of judges.

Judges
Antonio Androutsos – Panamanian businessman, of Greek origin.
Cibeles de Freitas – Social communicator, public relations and media training.
Joaquín De La Guardia – Financial Advisor.
Davide Russo – Italian businessman.

Contestants 

22 contestants competed for the title.

Notes

Post-pageant notes 

 Natalia Manrique of Norte de Santander was appointed as the representative of Colombia at Miss Grand International 2020 in Bangkok, Thailand where she was unplaced.
 Mariana Jaramillo of the Caribbean Region competed at Miss Grand International 2021 in Phuket, Thailand and was one of the 20 semi-finalists.
 Valentina Aldana of Cauca competed at Miss Supranational 2021 in Nowy Sącz, Poland where she was unplaced.
 María Fernanda Aristizábal of Quindío competed at Miss Universe 2022 in New Orleans, Louisiana, United States and was one the 16 semi-finalists.

References

External links
 

2019 in Colombia
Miss Colombia
Colombia